A double referendum was held in Liechtenstein on 4 April 2004. Voters were asked whether they approved of amending the law on compulsory accident insurance and funding a new building for the security forces. Both proposals were rejected.

Results

Amendment to the law on compulsory accident insurance

Funding a new building for the security forces

References

2004 referendums
2004 in Liechtenstein
2004
April 2004 events in Europe